Howard Charles is an English actor who is best known for his portrayal of Porthos in the BBC series The Musketeers.

Education
He studied at Kingston College in England between 2000 and 2005, earning a BTEC Level 3 Diploma in Performing Arts (Acting) before returning to start the BA (Hons) Acting for Stage and Media.

He then trained at the Drama Centre London and was awarded a Lady Rothermere Drama Award and a Leverhulme scholarship.

Theatre
Charles has appeared in: Blackta (The Young Vic), Macbeth (with the RSC), The Merchant of Venice (Royal Shakespeare Company), Enron (Chichester Festival Theatre, The Royal Court, West End), Painting A Wall (Finborough Theatre), The Hounding of David Olwale (various theatres including; Birmingham Repertory Theatre, Everyman Liverpool, Hackney Empire), Three Sisters (Manchester Royal Exchange), The Local Stigmatic (Edinburgh Festival), Les Jeudis (Centre Pompidou, Paris), Twelfth Night, The Lunatic Queen, Taniko, Measure for Measure, Le Cid, The Cherry Orchard and The Winslow Boy.

Filmography

Film

Television

Video games

References

External links
 

Living people
Alumni of the Drama Centre London
1983 births